Ben Bredeson (born February 20, 1998) is an American football guard for the New York Giants of the National Football League (NFL). He played college football at Michigan. Bredeson attended Arrowhead High School, where he was named the Gatorade High School Player of the Year in the state of Wisconsin and received first-team All-American honours by MaxPreps and USA Today.

High school career
Son of a former center at Illinois State, Bredeson started playing football in 7th grade. At Arrowhead High School he made the varsity team in his freshman year. As a junior he was a first-team All-State selection. As a senior he was again named to the All-State first-team and received first-team All-American honours by MaxPreps and USA Today. At the end of the season, he also received the Joe Thomas Award, as the top offensive lineman in the state of Wisconsin, and was named the Gatorade High School Player of the Year in Wisconsin. Bredeson was among the nation’s top high school seniors invited to the 2016 Under Armour All-America Game.

Recruiting
After receiving 17 scholarship offers, Bredeson cut down his choices to Alabama, Michigan, Notre Dame, Ohio State, Stanford and Wisconsin. On June 17, 2015, he committed to play for the Michigan Wolverines.

College career
In his freshman season at Michigan, Bredeson was switched from offensive tackle to guard, a position he never played in high school. Following the 2017 season, Bredeson was named to the All-Big Ten offensive second-team by both the coaches and the media. Following the 2018 season, Bredeson was again named to the All-Big Ten offensive second-team by both the coaches and the media. Following the 2019 season, Bredeson was named to the All-Big Ten offensive first-team by both the coaches and media, and was named a Second-team All-American by Walter Camp Football Foundation.

Professional career

Baltimore Ravens 
Bredeson was drafted by the Baltimore Ravens in the fourth round (143rd overall) of the 2020 NFL Draft.

In his rookie season with the Ravens, Bredeson played in 10 games mostly in a reserve and special teams role and was a healthy scratch for weeks 1-3, 6-7, and 10.

On January 9, 2021, Bredeson was placed on injured reserve.

New York Giants
On August 31, 2021, Bredeson was traded to the New York Giants along with a 2022 fifth round pick and a 2023 seventh round pick in exchange for a 2022 fourth round pick. He made his debut for the Giants in week 2 against the Washington Football Team after Nick Gates injured his leg. In Week 3 he made his first career start against the Atlanta Falcons. During the game he injured his hand and was named inactive the following week against the New Orleans Saints.

Bredeson was named the starting left guard Week 1 of the 2022 season after Shane Lemieux got injured during the first preseason game. On October 29, 2022, he was placed on injured reserve with a knee injury. He was activated on December 17.

References

External links

 Michigan Wolverines bio
 Baltimore Ravens bio

1998 births
Living people
American football offensive guards
People from Hartland, Wisconsin
Players of American football from Wisconsin
Sportspeople from the Milwaukee metropolitan area
Michigan Wolverines football players
Baltimore Ravens players
New York Giants players